Robert E. Naber (September 3, 1929 – February 8, 1998) was an American professional basketball player who spent one season in the National Basketball Association (NBA) as a member of the Indianapolis Olympians during the 1952–53 season.

Naber graduated from Covington Catholic High School in 1948. He attended the University of Louisville. He later taught and coached varsity basketball at Covington Catholic.

He was a member of the Northern Kentucky High School Athletic Directors Hall of Fame, the Northern Kentucky Hall of Fame, and the Northern Kentucky Sports Hall of Fame.

References

External links
 

1929 births
1998 deaths
American men's basketball players
Basketball players from Kentucky
Covington Catholic High School alumni
Forwards (basketball)
Indianapolis Olympians players
Louisville Cardinals men's basketball players
Sportspeople from Covington, Kentucky
Undrafted National Basketball Association players